James Leon Ford (born September 11, 1949) is a former American football running back in the National Football League for the New Orleans Saints. He also was a member of the New York Stars and Charlotte Hornets in the World Football League. He played college football at Texas Southern University.

Early years
Ford attended Stanton College Preparatory School in Jacksonville, Florida, where he practiced football, basketball, track and swimming.

He accepted a football scholarship from Texas Southern University, where he developed until late in his college career. As a senior in 1970, he registered 62 carries for 295 yards and 2 touchdowns.

Professional career
Ford was selected by the Dallas Cowboys in the thirteenth round (337th overall) of the 1971 NFL Draft. He was waived on September 13.

On September 14, 1971, he was claimed off waivers by the New Orleans Saints. He was named the starter at running back in the third game. He ranked third on the team in rushing with 379 yards, while playing in 9 games (7 starts) during the season, even though he suffered a season-ending knee injury in the ninth game. 

In 1972, he rejoined the team in the ninth game of season because of the recovery of a follow-up knee surgery. He played in 5 games (1 start), mainly on special teams and had 28 rushing yards in the season finale against the Green Bay Packers. 

On August 1, 1973, he was traded to the Houston Oilers in exchange for a sixth (#131-Jay Washington) and a tenth round draft choice (#235-Frosty Anderson). He was released on September 11.

Ford was also a member of the New York Stars/Charlotte Hornets of the World Football League from 1974 to 1975.

References

External links
Just Sports Stats

Living people
1949 births
Stanton College Preparatory School alumni
Players of American football from Jacksonville, Florida
American football running backs
Texas Southern Tigers football players
New Orleans Saints players
New York Stars players
Charlotte Hornets (WFL) players